Plattsville is an unincorporated community in Shelby County, in the U.S. state of Ohio.

History
Plattsville was platted in 1844. The community derives its name from John Platt, a local resident. A post office called Plattsville was established in 1854, and remained in operation until 1901.

References

Unincorporated communities in Shelby County, Ohio
Unincorporated communities in Ohio